Lwazi Samora Fihlani is a South African rugby union player who last played for the . He can play as a lock or flanker.

Career
Fihlani came through the Border youth system and played for their Under-21 team in 2005 and 2006.

He became a regular for the Bulldogs, making 59 first team appearances over the next five seasons.

He was named in the  wider training squad for the 2013 Super Rugby season, but was subsequently released to the Vodacom Cup squad. He was a regular in his first season at the Kings, making 17 appearances. However, he sustained a serious knee injury that ruled him out of the entire 2014 season. Although he was not initially named in the EP Kings' pre-season squad for the 2015, he did join in with the training group at the start of 2015 following a recovery from his knee injury.

References

1985 births
Living people
Border Bulldogs players
Eastern Province Elephants players
Griffons (rugby union) players
Rugby union players from East London, Eastern Cape
South African rugby union players
Rugby union flankers